Gole may refer to:

 Gole, Kuyavian-Pomeranian Voivodeship, Poland
 Gole, Masovian Voivodeship, Poland
 Gole (surname), a family name (including a list of people with that name)

See also
 Göle, small city and surrounding district in Turkey
 Budy-Gole, village in Greater Poland Voivodeship, Poland
 Goal (disambiguation)
 Gol (disambiguation)